Reginald Johnson may refer to:

Reginald Davis Johnson (1882-1952), American architect based in Pasadena, California
Reggie Johnson (basketball, born 1957)
Reggie Johnson (basketball, born 1989)